Sangeita Chauhaan  is an Indian actress. She was born in Vapi, Gujarat, India. She has appeared in the Kannada films Sharp Shooter and Luv U Alia. She is known as Meghna Chauhaan the lead in the Hindi Colors TV show, Ek Shringaar-Swabhiman.

Early life
Sangeita Chauhan is from Vapi, Gujarat. Sangeita had a happy love marriage with her previous husband, Chirag and they were married for 8 years. However, she filed for divorce in 2017.
She is now married to co-actor Manish Raisinghan since 30 June 2020 after they both fell in love on the sets of Ek Shringaar-Swabhiman.

Filmography

Television

References

External links
 Sangeita Chauhan on IMDb

Living people
Indian television actresses
Indian soap opera actresses
Actresses in Hindi television
Year of birth missing (living people)
Actresses from Gujarat
People from Vapi
Gujarati people
21st-century Indian actresses